The 2013 Uruguay Open was a professional tennis tournament played on clay courts. It was the ninth edition of the tournament, which was part of the 2013 ATP Challenger Tour. It took place in Montevideo, Uruguay between October 28 and November 3, 2012.

Singles main-draw entrants

Seeds

 1 Rankings are as of October 21, 2012.

Other entrants
The following players received wildcards into the singles main draw:
  Rodrigo Senattore
  Martín Cuevas
  Ariel Behar
  Marcelo Zormann da Silva

The following players received entry into the singles main draw via protected ranking:
  Eduardo Schwank

The following players received entry as a special exempt into the singles main draw:
  Pablo Cuevas

The following players received entry from the qualifying draw:
  Andrea Collarini
  Thiago Monteiro
  Marcelo Arévalo
  Gonzalo Lama

The following players received entry into the singles main draw as a lucky loser:
  Marco Trungelliti

Champions

Singles

 Thomaz Bellucci def.  Diego Sebastián Schwartzman 6–4, 6–4

Doubles

 Martín Cuevas /  Pablo Cuevas def.  André Ghem /  Rogério Dutra da Silva Walkover

External links
Official Website

Uruguay Open
Uruguay Open
2013 in Uruguayan tennis